This is a list of the squads that qualified for the 2012 Champions League Twenty20.

Auckland Aces
Coach:  Paul Strang

Chennai Super Kings
Coach:  Stephen Fleming

Delhi Daredevils
Ahead of the tournament, Mahela Jayawardene was named the captain after Virender Sehwag stepped down from the position. Sehwag had captained the team for four of the past five years.

Coach:  Eric Simons

Hampshire Royals
Hampshire were able to include Shahid Afridi in their squad as he was registered with the team, despite him having not played any matches in the 2012 Friends Life t20 due to visa issues. From the domestic tournament, Hampshire were unable to have Neil McKenzie and Simon Katich due to them having qualified with other teams.

Coach:  Craig White

Kolkata Knight Riders
Coach:  Trevor Bayliss

Highveld Lions
Coach:  Geoffrey Toyana

Mumbai Indians
Coach:  Robin Singh

Perth Scorchers
Coach:  Lachlan Stevens

Sialkot Stallions
Coach:  Naved Anjum

Sydney Sixers
Coach:  Corey Richards

Titans
Coach:  Matthew Maynard

Trinidad and Tobago are without Kieron Pollard, Dwayne Bravo and Sunil Narine, who all elected to play for Indian teams.

Coach:  David Williams

Uva Next
Coach:  Dave Nosworthy

Yorkshire Carnegie
Yorkshire's overseas player David Miller may only be available for their first match due to commitments in South African domestic cricket. Yorkshire were unable to include Andrew Hodd due to him only being on loan from Sussex and having not played any Twenty20 matches for Yorkshire.

Coach:  Jason Gillespie

References

External links
 2012 Champions League Twenty20 squads on ESPN CricInfo

Champions League Twenty20 squads